Frank Juric (born 28 October 1973) is an Australian former goalkeeper.

Club career
Born in Melbourne, Juric began his professional career in the former Australian national league with Melbourne Knights, where he won two league titles, before moving to the newly formed Collingwood Warriors (also based in Melbourne). The club struggled financially though and was unable to go on beyond this solitary season, in which they finished second bottom.

The goalkeeper took this as his cue to move to Europe, although the transfer was a protracted affair, as Collingwood Warriors – no longer technically in existence – still demanded a fee from Fortuna Düsseldorf. Eventually, this was resolved by the German club paying $30,000 and Juric was free to move for the 1997–98 season.

His first season in Germany was relatively successful as Fortuna Düsseldorf finished seventh in the 2. Bundesliga. However, the following year they suffered relegation to the Regionalliga-West. However, Juric had been spotted by Bundesliga team Bayer 04 Leverkusen and he signed for the high-flying club in summer 1999.

Juric was used as a backup keeper here, behind the likes of Adam Matysek and Hans-Jörg Butt but still managed 11 Bundesliga appearances as the club enjoyed a series of strong performances both domestically, and notably in the 2002 Champions League, where they reached the final. Juric himself appeared twice in the UEFA Champions League in 2002–03, against Olympiacos and Manchester United.

In June 2004, he joined fellow Bundesliga side Hannover 96 as second choice keeper behind Robert Enke. His time with the Reds has been blighted by persistent knee problems, limiting to just a single appearance in his first three seasons there, playing in a 2–2 draw with Borussia Mönchengladbach on 6 May 2006.

In May 2008, it was announced that Juric was to return to his native Australia for the 2008–09 A-League season, with Perth Glory. He competed for the number one jersey alongside Olyroo Tando Velaphi, while Jason Petkovic was retained as a backup and advisor to the youth team. Juric's poor run of form led to the goalkeeping position given to Tando Velaphi.

In May 2009, Juric retired as a player and joined Glory as goalkeeping coach, when they signed Aleks Vrteski as the club's second goalkeeper.

International career
Juric made two full appearances for the Australian national team, making his debut on 10 November 1995 in a 1996 OFC Nations Cup match against New Zealand which finished goalless, and also appearing on 10 February 1996 in a 1–4 friendly defeat to Japan.

He also competed in the 1996 Olympics in the football competition and was an unused squad member in the 2001 FIFA Confederations Cup, where they achieved third place. However, the likes of Mark Schwarzer, Zeljko Kalac and Mark Bosnich had severely limited his hopes of international football.

Career statistics

Honours

Club
Melbourne Knights
 NSL: 1994–95, 1995–96
 NSL Premiers: 1991–92, 1993–94, 1994–95

Bayer Leverkusen
 Bundesliga: Runner-up 1999–2000 and 2001–02
 DFB-Pokal: Runner-up 2001–02
 UEFA Champions League Runner-up: 2001–02

International
Australia
 OFC Nations Cup: 1996

References

External links
 Oz Football profile

1973 births
Living people
Australian people of Croatian descent
Association football goalkeepers
Australian soccer players
Australian expatriate soccer players
Australia international soccer players
Australian expatriate sportspeople in Germany
Expatriate footballers in Germany
Olympic soccer players of Australia
A-League Men players
Bundesliga players
2. Bundesliga players
Bayer 04 Leverkusen players
Bayer 04 Leverkusen II players
Fortuna Düsseldorf players
Hannover 96 players
Melbourne Knights FC players
Perth Glory FC players
National Soccer League (Australia) players
Australian Institute of Sport soccer players
Collingwood Warriors S.C. players
1996 OFC Nations Cup players
Footballers at the 1996 Summer Olympics
2001 FIFA Confederations Cup players